The 1996 Sparkassen Cup was a women's tennis tournament played on indoor carpet courts in Leipzig in Germany that was part of the Tier II category of the 1996 WTA Tour. It was the seventh edition of the tournament and was held from 30 September through 6 October 1996. Fourth-seeded Anke Huber won the singles title.

Finals

Singles

 Anke Huber defeated  Iva Majoli 5–7, 6–3, 6–1
 It was Huber's 2nd title of the year and the 9th of her career.

Doubles

 Kristie Boogert /  Nathalie Tauziat defeated  Sabine Appelmans /  Miriam Oremans 6–4, 6–4
 It was Boogert's 2nd title of the year and the 2nd of her career. It was Tauziat's 1st title of the year and the 14th of her career.

References

External links
 ITF tournament edition details

Sparkassen Cup
Sparkassen Cup (tennis)
1996 in German tennis